There are over 20,000 Grade II* listed buildings in England. This page is a list of these buildings in the district of Corby in Northamptonshire.

List of buildings

|}

See also
 Grade I listed buildings in Northamptonshire
 Grade II* listed buildings in Northamptonshire
 Grade II* listed buildings in Daventry (district)
 Grade II* listed buildings in East Northamptonshire
 Grade II* listed buildings in Kettering (borough)
 Grade II* listed buildings in Northampton
 Grade II* listed buildings in South Northamptonshire
 Grade II* listed buildings in Wellingborough (borough)

Notes

External links

 
Lists of Grade II* listed buildings in Northamptonshire